Richard Lloyd George, 2nd Earl Lloyd-George of Dwyfor (15 February 1889 – 1 May 1968) was a British soldier and peer in the peerage of the United Kingdom, a member of the House of Lords from 1945 until his death.

The son of the Liberal prime minister David Lloyd George by his first wife, Margaret Owen, Lloyd George was educated at Portmadoc School and Christ's College, Cambridge, graduating BA in 1910. During the First World War he was commissioned into the Royal Engineers and rose to the rank of Major. He became an associate member of the Institution of Civil Engineers and served in the British Army again during the Second World War.

On 7 April 1917 Lloyd George married Roberta McAlpine (1898–1966), a daughter of Sir Robert McAlpine, 1st Baronet. They had two children, Valerie Davidia (1918–2000) and Owen (1924–2010), before being divorced in 1933. In 1935 Lloyd George married secondly Winifred Emily Peedle, a daughter of Thomas W. Peedle. Valerie became the wife of the academic and broadcasting executive, Sir Goronwy Daniel.

On 1 January 1945 his father was created Earl Lloyd-George of Dwyfor, and he gained the courtesy title of Viscount Gwynedd. Less than three months later, on 26 March 1945, his father died of cancer and he inherited his peerage, unusually becoming the first member of the family to sit in the House of Lords, as David Lloyd George had been too ill to do so.

He wrote a biography of his mother, Dame Margaret, and of his father, Lloyd George.

Works

Notes

External links
 
 David Lloyd George Exhibition, National Library of Wales

 

1889 births
1968 deaths
Alumni of Christ's College, Cambridge
British Army personnel of World War II
Earls Lloyd-George of Dwyfor
Richard
Royal Engineers officers
20th-century English nobility